Medzhybizh Castle (Medzhybiz'kyi zamok), built as a bulwark against Ottoman expansion in the 1540s, became one of the strongest fortresses of the Crown of the Kingdom of Poland in Podolia. It is situated at the confluence of the Southern Bug and Buzhenka rivers, in the town of Medzhybizh (Polish: Międzybuż), Ukraine. Today the castle is part of the State Historical-Cultural Preserve.

The first wooden fort was built around 1146 by the rulers of Bolokhov. The fort probably survived the Mongol invasion, but was dismantled by Daniel of Galicia in 1254 at the bidding of the Golden Horde. The new fort was built by Koriat's heirs after the Grand Duke of Lithuania had defeated the Golden Horde at the Battle of Blue Waters in 1362. 

Podolia passed to the Polish Crown in 1432. The castle was confiscated from the House of Koriat and became the property of the Polish kings. About 1540 the castle was completely rebuilt by its new owner, Mikołaj Sieniawski. The Sieniawski family owned Medzhybizh (Polish: Międzyboż) until its extinction in the early 18th century. The stronghold was reconquered from the Turks in 1699 and passed to the Czartoryski family in 1731. 

The last rebuilding effort was undertaken by the Russian imperial authorities in the 19th century. Much restoration has been carried out on the fortress since 1968. Within the walls are a small-scale museum and a church from 1586.

Since 2020, Medzhybizh Castle has been an associate member of the European Cultural Route of FORTE CULTURA e.V. In April 2022, at the annual international conference in Terezin, Medzhybizh Castle was granted the status of official stop on the European Cultural Route FORTE CULTURA.

References

External links
 Official website of the State Historical-Cultural Preserve "Medzhybizh"
 Webcam Live of the State Historical-Cultural Preserve "Medzhybizh"

Castles in Ukraine
Forts in Ukraine
Buildings and structures in Khmelnytskyi Oblast
Tourist attractions in Khmelnytskyi Oblast